Dubovikovo is a rural locality (a selo) in Tverdokhlebovskoye Rural Settlement, Bogucharsky District, Voronezh Oblast, Russia. The population was 59 as of 2010. There are 4 streets.

Geography 
Dubovikovo is located 30 km northwest of Boguchar (the district's administrative centre) by road. Orobinsky is the nearest rural locality.

References 

Rural localities in Bogucharsky District